The following list of highest junior scores in figure skating contains the highest junior scores earned from the 2018–2019 season onwards, under the ISU Judging System (IJS). The 2018–2019 season began on 1 July 2018.

After being trialed in 2003, the IJS replaced the old 6.0 system in the 2004–2005 figure skating season. Up to and including the 2017–2018 season, the Grade of Execution (GOE) scoring system for each program element ranged between –3 and +3. Starting with the 2018–2019 season, the GOE was expanded to range between –5 and +5. Hence, the International Skating Union (ISU) have restarted all records from the 2018–2019 season and all previous statistics have been marked as "historical". Accordingly, this page lists only the highest junior scores achieved from the 2018–2019 season onwards, using the –5/+5 GOE scoring range.

The following lists are included:
Records: current junior record holders; technical and component record scores; progression of junior record scores
Personal bests: highest personal best scores; highest PB technical element scores; highest PB program component scores
Absolute bests: lists of absolute best scores

Note: In the case of personal best lists, only one score is listed for any one skater, i.e. their personal best. The absolute best lists may include more than one score for the same skater.

The ISU only recognizes the best scores that are set at international competitions run under the ISU's rules, and does not recognize, for example, scores that are obtained at national figure skating championships. The junior competitions recognized by the ISU are: Youth Olympics (including the team event), World Junior Championships, and Junior GP events.

Junior record holders

Men

Women

Pairs

Ice dance

Technical and component record scores 
TES = Technical Element Score
PCS = Program Component Score

Men

Women

Pairs

Ice dance

Highest personal best scores 
The following lists include only personal best scores of skaters. To see lists where multiple scores from the same skater are included, see absolute best scores.

Men

Best total scores 
All skaters whose personal best total score is above 217 points are listed here.

Best short program scores 
All skaters whose personal best short program score is above 77 points are listed here.

Best free skating scores 
All skaters whose personal best free skating score is above 141 points are listed here.

Women

Best total scores 
All skaters whose personal best total score is above 191 points are listed here.

Best short program scores 
All skaters whose personal best short program score is above 67.50 points are listed here.

Best free skating scores 
All skaters whose personal best free skating score is above 127 points are listed here.

Pairs

Best total scores 
All pairs teams whose personal best total score is above 150 points are listed here.

Best short program scores 
All pairs teams whose personal best short program score is above 55.50 points are listed here.

Best free skating scores 
All pairs teams whose personal best free skating score is above 98 points are listed here.

Ice dance

Best total scores 
All ice dance teams whose personal best total score is above 153 points are listed here.

Best rhythm dance scores 
All ice dance teams whose personal best rhythm dance score is above 61.50 points are listed here.

Best free dance scores 
All ice dance teams whose personal best free dance score is above 92 points are listed here.

Absolute best scores

Men

Best total scores 
All junior scores above 225 points are listed here.

Best short program scores 
All junior short program scores above 79.50 points are listed here.

Best free skating scores 
All junior free skating scores above 148 points are listed here.

Women

Best total scores 
All junior scores above 204 points are listed here.

Best short program scores 
All junior short program scores above 70 points are listed here.

Best free skating scores 
All junior free skating scores above 135 points are listed here.

Pairs

Best total scores 
All junior scores above 179 points are listed here.

Best short program scores 
All junior short program scores above 64 points are listed here.

Best free skating scores 
All junior free skating scores above 116 points are listed here.

Ice dance

Best total scores 
All junior scores above 166 points are listed here.

Best rhythm dance scores 
All junior rhythm dance scores above 66 points are listed here.

Best free dance scores 
All junior free dance scores above 100.50 points are listed here.

Progression of junior record scores

Men

Total score 
Progression of junior men's combined total record score. This list starts from the skater who first scored above 180 points.

Short program score 
Progression of junior men's short program record score. This list starts from the skater who first scored above 60 points.

Free skating score 
Progression of junior men's free skating record score. This list starts from the skater who first scored above 120 points.

Women

Total score 
Progression of junior women's combined total record score. This list starts from the skater who first scored above 170 points.

Short program score 
Progression of junior women's short program record score. This list starts from the skater who first scored above 60 points.

Free skating score 
Progression of junior women's free skating record score. This list starts from the skater who first scored above 110 points.

Pairs

Total score 
Progression of junior pairs' combined total record score. This list starts from the pair who first scored above 140 points.

Short program score 
Progression of junior pairs' short program record score. This list starts from the pair who first scored above 50 points.

Free skating score 
Progression of junior pairs' free skating record score. This list starts from the pair who first scored above 90 points.

Ice dance

Total score 
Progression of junior ice dance combined total record score. This list starts from the ice dance team who first scored above 140 points.

Rhythm dance score 
Progression of junior rhythm dance record score. This list starts from the ice dance team who first scored above 50 points.

Free dance score 
Progression of junior free dance record score. This list starts from the ice dance team who first scored above 80 points.

Highest personal best technical element scores 
TES = Technical Element Score

Men

Short program

Free skating

Women

Short program

Free skating

Pairs

Short program

Free skating

Ice dance

Rhythm dance

Free dance

Progression of record technical element scores 
TES = Technical Element Score

Men

Short program score 
Progression of junior men's short program record TES score. This list starts from the skater who first scored above 40 points.

Free skating score 
Progression of junior men's free skating record TES score. This list starts from the skater who first scored above 80 points.

Women

Short program score 
Progression of junior women's short program record TES score. This list starts from the skater who first scored above 40 points.

Free skating score 
Progression of junior women's free skating record TES score. This list starts from the skater who first scored above 70 points.

Pairs

Short program score 
Progression of junior pairs' short program record TES score. This list starts from the pair who first scored above 35 points.

Free skating score 
Progression of junior pairs' free skating record TES score. This list starts from the pair who first scored above 60 points.

Ice dance

Rhythm dance score 
Progression of junior rhythm dance record TES score. This list starts from the ice dance team who first scored above 35 points.

Free dance score 
Progression of junior free dance record TES score. This list starts from the ice dance team who first scored above 50 points.

Highest personal best program component scores 
PCS = Program Component Score

Men

Short program

Free skating

Women

Short program

Free skating

Pairs

Short program

Free skating

Ice dance

Rhythm dance

Free dance

Miscellaneous junior records and highest element scores

Miscellaneous records

Men

Women

Pairs

Highest element scores 
GOE = Grade of Execution
BV = Base value

These are the highest scored elements using the new –5/+5 GOE range. Note: an 'x' after the base value means that the base value has been multiplied by 1.1 because the jump was executed in the second half of the program.

Men

Highest valued single jump 
All scores above 11.50 points are listed here.

Highest valued combos 
All scores above 15.30 points are listed here.

Women

Highest valued single jump 
All scores above 8.50 points are listed here.

Highest valued combos 
All scores above 13.50 points are listed here.

Pairs

Highest valued twists 
All scores above 8 points are listed here.

Highest valued throw jumps 
All scores above 7 points are listed here.

Highest valued lifts 
All scores above 9.50 points are listed here.

Highest valued jump sequences/combos 
All scores above 8 points are listed here.

Highest valued death spirals

Backward outside 
All scores above 6 points are listed here.

Backward inside 
All scores above 4.50 points are listed here.

Forward outside

Forward inside 
All scores above 4.50 points are listed here.

See also 
 List of highest scores in figure skating
 List of highest historical scores in figure skating
 List of highest historical junior scores in figure skating
 ISU Judging System
 Figure skating records and statistics

References

External links 
 International Skating Union

Figure skating-related lists
Figure skating records and statistics